Danielle Steel's Palomino is a 1991 American made-for-television romantic drama film based on a 1981 novel by Danielle Steel about the romance between a photographer  and a cowboy. A subplot involves a romance between characters played by Rod Taylor and Eva Marie Saint, who acted together years earlier in Raintree County (1957) and 36 Hours (1964). The film aired on October 21, 1991 on NBC.

References

External links

1991 romantic drama films
1991 television films
1991 films
American romantic drama films
NBC Productions films
NBC network original films
Films scored by Dominic Frontiere
Films based on works by Danielle Steel
American drama television films
Films directed by Michael Miller (director)
1990s American films